Greggsville, also known as Greggs, is an unincorporated community located in Ohio County,  West Virginia, United States.

Geography
Greggsville  is located at an elevation of 741 feet (226 m).

Notable people
 Gunnery Sergeant Gerald L. Leighton, United States Marine Corps, Retired
 Chief Petty Officer Michael Leighton, United States Navy, Retired. Michael Leighton was also the first resident of West Virginia to ride a bicycle from coast to coast, starting in Seattle, Washington and finishing 47 days later in Atlantic City, New Jersey as part of the 1988 A.L.A. Trans America bicycle trek.

References

Unincorporated communities in Ohio County, West Virginia
Unincorporated communities in West Virginia